Ahmed Sherif Mostafa Kamal (born 26 July 2003) is an Egyptian professional footballer who plays as a forward for Pharco.

Career
Sherif began his senior career with Wadi Degla, with 2 goals in 22 appearances. He transferred to Pharco on 13 October 2021, signing a 5-year contract.

Personal life
On 7 December 2021, on the way back from training, Sherif was in a car accident that led to the death of his fiancee.

Career statistics

Club

Notes

References

2003 births
Living people
Egyptian footballers
Egypt youth international footballers
Association football forwards
Wadi Degla SC players
Pharco FC players
Egyptian Premier League players